is a railway station on the Flower Nagai Line in Nanyō, Yamagata, Japan, operated by the Yamagata Railway Company.

Lines

Station layout
The station is unstaffed and consists of a single side platform serving one track.

History
The station opened on 25 October 1988.

Surrounding area
 Nanyō City Hall
 Nanyō Fire station 
  National Route 113

References

Railway stations in Japan opened in 1988
Railway stations in Yamagata Prefecture
Yamagata Railway Flower Nagai Line